The Bathing Ghat in Bulandshahr is a stone platform with steps positioned between four domed towers on the banks of the Kali River in Bulandshahr, India. Its foundation stone was laid in 1878 under the supervision of British district magistrate and collector for the Indian Civil Service, Frederick Growse. It was completed in 1880.

Origin

The bathing ghat at Bulandshahr is a stone platform with steps positioned between four domed towers on the banks of the Kali River. Its foundation stone was laid on 1 November 1878 under the supervision of British district magistrate and collector for the Indian Civil Service, Frederick Growse. An executive engineer informed the British government in India that it would be an "eye-sore" and in visual obstruction of the bridge, resulting in a two-year delay of construction.

Structure
The towers are made from stone brick and each have eight sides, with red sandstone panels set in frames of white stone. Two panels display the names of those who made financial contributions to the building of the ghat; listed in order of amount donated. Opposite the ghat, further steps were built. The river serves as a boundary to the east of Bulandshahr, and the bridge receives the main roads entering the town, resulting in the towers forming a landmark site for approaching visitors. Each tower is topped with eaves and brackets over a plinth that provides support to a dome-topped open kiosk.

Cost
John Lockwood Kipling noted that Growse had ensured it was locally financed, built in adherence to traditional Indian practices, and was "untouched by European training". The most expensive part of construction was creating the deep wells for the tower foundations.

An appendix in Growse's Bulandshahr; or, Sketches of an Indian district; social, historical and architectural (1884) displays the names of those that provided finances for the building of the ghat.

Function
Within a few years of construction, it had become a site for local festivals and displays of fireworks, particularly at Holi.

Gallery (2023)

References

External links 

Ghats of India
Bulandshahr
Buildings and structures completed in the 1880s